The Letná Formation is a Late Ordovician (Sandbian, or in the regional stratigraphy Berounian) geologic formation of the Prague Basin, Bohemian Massif in the Czech Republic. The formation crops out in the Czech capital, more specifically at Letná Hill, after which the formation is named. The type locality is located at Malá Strana, Holešovice district.

Because of the excellent preservation, including gut remains, of a wide assemblage of early Paleozoic taxa in which trilobites dominate, the formation, which is lean in fossils in many areas but exceptionally rich in what has been interpreted as storm beds, has been designated a Konservat-Lagerstätte.

Description 
The Prague Basin contains an Ordovician to Devonian succession in the larger Bohemian Massif. The formation conformably overlies the Libeň Formation and is overlain by the Vinice Formation.

The formation consists of a rhythmic alternation of sandstones (greywackes and subgreywackes), quartzites, intercalated with siltstones and shales with limestone lenses in the upper part of the succession, deposited in a shallow marine environment, representing a flysch deposition in the early Paleozoic. While in most of the layers fossils are absent, certain levels contain a rich assemblage of shallow marine fauna interpreted as storm-induced beds. The concentration of a wide variety of excellently conserved fossils of the Letná Formation has granted it the name of a Konservat-Lagerstätte, giving insight into the diversification of marine ecosystems.

A rather diverse fauna composed of brachiopods, trilobites, echinoderms, conularids, and non-trilobite arthropods has been found in outcrops located between Zdice and Chrustenice. This area probably represented a rather shallow environment in the northwestern part of the basin. The fossils are usually fragmentary and preserved as internal or external moulds associated with angular claystone fragments within quartzose sandstones to siltstones. Accumulations of these fossil remains are commonly found in thick-bedded quartzose sandstones of light-grey and yellow or grey-brown color, which might have been deposited in areas sheltered from wave activity by sand bars.

Five communities of marine fauna were identified in the formation. The rich brachiopod dominated Drabovia Community is associated with shallow water, well-sorted quartzose sandstones. The Bicuspina Community, which probably represents a slightly deeper environment, is typically found in the poorly sorted greywackes of the higher horizons of the Letná Formation. These two communities constitute the Drabovia-Aegiromena Fauna. In more proximal environments, this fauna is replaced by the trilobite-dominated Dalmanitina-Deanaspis Association, which contains Birmanites ingens and Selenopeltis buchi. The more distal, probably deeper parts of the basin are characterized by a poorly diversified assemblage of trilobites associated with rare graptolites. Lastly, trilobites of the so-called Cyclopygid Biofacies and brachiopods of the Paterula Association are typical for the deepest portions of the Prague Basin. Intertidal (Skolithos ichnofacies) and near-shore (Cruziana ichnofacies) environments are also evidenced by ichnofossils.

Fossilized gut remains have been observed in four of the about twenty trilobite species present in the Letná Formation: Birmanites ingens, Dalmanitina socialis, Deanaspis goldfussi and Selenopeltis buchi. These four trilobites belong to the Dalmanitina-Deanaspis Association, characterizing rather proximal and shallow environments of the Letná Formation. Most of the non-trilobite arthropods discovered in this formation, including forms with non-mineralized exoskeletons, are also found associated with D. goldfussi and/or D. socialis. This suggests that the development of conditions conducive to soft-tissue fossilization was not uncommon in the environment represented by the Dalmanitina-Deanaspis Association.

Fossil content 
The following fossils were reported from the formation:

 Trilobites
 Actinopeltis completa
 Birmanites ingens
 Calymenella parvula
 Caryon bohemicus
 Cekovia transfuga
 Colpocoryphe grandis
 Dalmanitina socialis
 Deanaspis goldfussi
 Eudolatites dubia
 Eccoptochile (Eccoptochile) clavigera
 Eccoptochile (Eccoptochiloides) tumescens
 Kloucekia phillipsi
 Pharostoma pulchrum
 Placoparia (Hawleia) grandis
 Plaesiacomia rara
 Platycoryphe bohemica
 Primaspis (Primaspis) primordialis
 Selenopeltis buchi
 Stenopareia panderi
 Vysocania moraveci
 Zeliszkella (Zeliszkella) hawlei
 Girvanopyge sp.
 Heterocyclopyge sp.
 Prionocheilus sp.
 Non-trilobite arthropods
 Duslia insignis
 Quasicaris bohemica
 Furca bohemica
 Furca sp.
 Zonozoe drabowiensis
 Crinoids
 Caleidocrinus multiramus
 Lingulata
 Lingula deleta
 Orbiculoidea grandis
 Schizocrania incola
 Schizotreta sp.
 Gastropods
 Asinomphalus antiqua
 Bucania draboviensis
 Bucanopsina calypso
 Bucanopsis comata
 Cyrtodiscus procer
 Holopea antiquata
 Tritonophon bohemica
 T. peeli
 Paragastropoda
 Antispira praecox
 Bivalves
 Astarte convergens
 Concavodonta ponderata
 Grammysia catilloides
 Leptodesma patricia
 Modiolopsis veterana
 Myoplusia bilunata
 Praenucula bohemica
 P. dispar
 Deceptrix sp.
 Palaeoneilo sp.
 Crustaceans
 Nothozoe pollens
 Ostracods
 Cerninella bohemica
 Crescentilla pugnax
 Cytheropsis testis
 Hastatellina sp.
 Trubinella latens
 Rostroconchia
 Ribeiria apusoides
 Blastoidea
 Mespilocystites bohemicus
 Anatifopsis sp.
 Rhynchonellata
 Svobodaina ellipsoides
 Jezercia chrustenicensis
 Drabovinella draboviensis
 Hirnantia ulrichi
 Drabovia asperula
 D. fascicostata
 D. redux
 Chrustenopora sp.
 Onniella sp.
 Saukrodictya sp.
 Craniata
 Petrocrania obsoleta
 Strophomenata
 Aegiromena aquila
 Bicuspina cava
 B. multicostellata
 Rafinesquina occulata
 Tergomya
 Barrandicellopsis extenuata
 Cytherina graegaria
 Dactylogonia blyskavensis
 Sinuitopsis neglecta
 Tentaculita
 Conchicolites confertus
 Edrioasteroidea
 Hemicystites bohemicus
 H. velatus
 Eocrinoidea
 Ascocystites drabowiensis
 A. cf. micraster
 Echinosphaerites infaustus
 Macrocystella bohemica
 Cystidea obscondita
 Rhombifera bohemica
 Stylophora
 Mitrocystites mitra
 Soluta
 Dendrocystites sedgwicki
 Scyphozoa
 Anaconularia anomala
 Archaeoconularia fecunda
 A. insignis
 Conularia rugulosa
 Exoconularia exquisita
 Metaconularia pyramidata
 Pseudoconularia grandissima
 P. nobilis
 Merostomata
 Triopus draboviensis
 Polychaeta
 Serpulites sp.
 Machaeridia
 Plumulites folliculum
 Algae
 Dendrocystis barrandei
 Other
 Chasmatoporella havliceki
 Versispira contraria

Gallery

See also 

 Fezouata Formation
 Folkeslunda Limestone
 Soom Shale

References

Bibliography

Further reading 
 R. J. Horný. 1997. Circumbilical retractor muscle attachment area in the Ordovician trilobed bellerophontoidean gastropod Tritonophon peeli sp. n. (Mollusca). Bulletin of the Czech Geological Survey 72(4):333-338
 F. C. Shaw. 1995. Ordovician trinucleid trilobites of the Prague Basin, Czech Republic. Paleontological Society Memoir 40:1-23
 V. Havlíček and J. Vaněk. 1966. The biostratigraphy of the Ordovician of Bohemia. Sborník Geologických Věd, Paleontologie 8:7-69
 Šnajdr, M., 1956. Trilobiti drabovských a letenských vrstev českého ordoviku. [The trilobites from the Drabov and Letná Beds of the Ordovician of Bohemia]. Sborník Ústředního ústavu geologického, 22, 477-533 [in Czech, with English abstract]
 J. Perner. 1903. Gastropodes, Tome 1: Patellidae et Bellerophontidae 1-164

 
Geologic formations of the Czech Republic
Ordovician System of Europe
Sandstone formations
Shale formations
Siltstone formations
Limestone formations
Quartzite formations
Open marine deposits
Shallow marine deposits
Tidal deposits
Fossiliferous stratigraphic units of Europe
Paleontology in the Czech Republic
Formations